Hands Up! is a 1926 American silent comedy film directed by Clarence Badger, co-written by Monte Brice and Lloyd Corrigan, and starring Raymond Griffith, one of the great silent movie comedians. The film features fictional incidents involving actual historical figures such as Abraham Lincoln, Brigham Young, and Sitting Bull.

Plot
As described in a film magazine review, during the Civil War, Jack, an officer and spy for Confederate States Army, attempts to secure a Union gold mine that had been discovered by Allan Pinkerton for Abraham Lincoln, and keep a load of gold from reaching the Union Army. He tries to blow up the mine but exposes a richer vein of gold. He is caught and about to be hanged when he is saved by two daughters of the mine owner. Jack grabs two guns and successfully holds up the gang when word arrives that the war has been declared over. Jack then follows Brigham Young's example and starts for Salt Lake City so that he can marry both daughters. Along the way, while engaging in lovemaking with the young women, the stage coach is shot full of arrows, which he describes as "bee stings."

Cast

Preservation
In 2005, this film was selected for preservation in the United States National Film Registry by the Library of Congress as being "culturally, historically, or aesthetically significant".

References

External links

Hands Up! essay by Steve Massa on the National Film Registry web site
Hands Up! essay by Daniel Eagan in Film Legacy: The Authoritative Guide to the Landmark Movies in the National Film Registry, A&C Black, 2010 , pages 111-112  

Progressive Silent Film List: Hands Up! at silentera.com

1926 films
1926 comedy films
1920s spy comedy films
American black-and-white films
American Civil War films
American Civil War spy films
American silent feature films
American spy comedy films
Films directed by Clarence G. Badger
Paramount Pictures films
United States National Film Registry films
1920s American films
Silent American comedy films
1920s English-language films